Kajtasovo is a village in Serbia. It is situated in the Bela Crkva municipality, in the South Banat District, Vojvodina province. The village has a Serb ethnic majority (88.15%) and a population of 287 people (2002 census).

Historical population

1961: 494
1971: 459
1981: 424
1991: 350
2002: 287

References
Slobodan Ćurčić, Broj stanovnika Vojvodine, Novi Sad, 1996.

See also
List of places in Serbia
List of cities, towns and villages in Vojvodina

Populated places in Serbian Banat
Populated places in South Banat District
Bela Crkva